The 2017 USA Rugby League season is the seventh season of the USA Rugby League National Premiership competition, and its third as the undisputed top-level rugby league competition in the United States. Twelve teams compete for the USARL Championship.  The season began on Saturday, June 3, and concluded with the Championship Final on Saturday, August 26.

Team changes
The Bucks County Sharks and the DC Slayers folded after the 2016 season bringing the number of teams down to 12.

Regular season

Teams in the North Conference play in an eight-round regular season with semi-finals on August 5 and final on August 12. South Conference teams play a six-round regular season with semi-finals on July 29 and final on August 12

Week 1

Final
The Atlanta Rhinos defeated the New York Knights 32-18 in the grand final to become the 2017 USARL National Champions.

References

2017 in rugby league
USA Rugby League